Karnali Air Pvt. Ltd. was a helicopter airline based at Tribhuvan International Airport in Kathmandu, Nepal, operating chartered helicopter services. It merged with Necon Air in 2001 but kept operating under its name.

History 
In 2001 Karnali Air was, along with Shangri-La Air, part of an ‘operational merge’ with Necon Air. The Executive Chairman of Karnali Air, Narayan Singh Pun took on the position of Executive Chairman and managing director of Necon Air.

Fleet 
At the time of closure, Karnali Air operated the following aircraft:

Accidents and incidents 
 19 September 2002 – A Karnali Air Eurocopter Ecureuil on a medivac mission was attacked in Jubu, Solukhumbu and set on fire by members of the People's Liberation Army, Nepal during the Nepalese Civil War. The pilot and one passenger were abducted but let go one day later.
8 August 2006 – A Karnali Air Mil Mi-8MTV-1 crashed at Tribhuvan International Airport during a ground check-up. Seven people were injured.

References 

Defunct airlines of Nepal
Airlines disestablished in 2003
Defunct helicopter airlines